Biomphalaria salinarum is a species of air-breathing freshwater snail, an aquatic pulmonate gastropod mollusk in the family Planorbidae, the ram's horn snails.

This is a taxon inquirendum.

Distribution
This species is found in Angola and Namibia.

References

 Morelet, A. (1867 [dated 1868]). Voyage du Dr Friederich Welwitsch exécuté par ordre du Gouvernement Portugais dans les royaumes d'Angola et de Benguella (Afrique équinoxiale). Mollusques terrestres et fluviatiles. Baillière et fils, Paris/London/New York. 1–102, 9 pls, map.
 Brown D.S. (1994). Freshwater snails of Africa and their medical importance, 2nd edition. London: Taylor and Francis, 607 p.
 Connolly, M. (1939). A monographic survey of South African non-marine Mollusca. Annals of the South African Museum 33: 1–660.

External links
 Jarne, P.; Pointier, J.-P.; David, P. (2011). Biosystematics of Biomphalaria spp. with an Emphasis on Biomphalaria glabrata. Biomphalaria Snails and Larval Trematodes. 1-32

Biomphalaria
Gastropods described in 1868
Freshwater snails of Africa
Invertebrates of Angola
Invertebrates of Namibia
Taxonomy articles created by Polbot